The expressive function of law is the effect of law to create or validate social norms beyond the fear of punishment. For example, the criminalization of homosexuality may be maintained in order to express disapproval of homosexuality, even if it is not regularly enforced.

References

Further reading

Law